Malyayevka is a rural locality (a selo) and the administrative center of Malyayevskoye Rural Settlement, Leninsky District, Volgograd Oblast, Russia. The population was 1,260 as of 2010. There are 31 streets.

Geography 
Malyayevka is located 66 km from Volgograd, 11 km west of Leninsk (the district's administrative centre) by road. Novostroyka is the nearest rural locality.

References 

Rural localities in Leninsky District, Volgograd Oblast